Lieutenant Joe Leaphorn is a fictional character created by the twentieth-century American mystery writer Tony Hillerman; he is one of two officers of the Navajo Tribal Police who are featured in a number of Hillerman's novels. The other officer is Jim Chee.

Profile

Personal life and education
Joe Leaphorn's mother was Anna Gorman. His maternal grandfather was named Hosteen Klee Thlumie, called Hosteen Klee by young Leaphorn. As a child, Leaphorn was told the stories of the Navajo way of life (Listening Woman) by Thlumie. He was educated in the lower grades near home on the reservation, but sent to boarding school for the higher grades. He attended college at Arizona State University, where he completed a master's degree in anthropology, writing a thesis paper (Dance Hall of the Dead). In addition to anthropology, he has a lifelong interest in the many religions of American Indians and peoples of the world. In the earlier books of the series, Leaphorn is married to the love of his life, Emma. They have no children. 

In Skinwalkers, Leaphorn recalls meeting his wife at university. They have been married for thirty years, and he is preoccupied by her health problems, which he fears could be Alzheimer's disease but are diagnosed as arising from a brain tumor at the end of the novel. In A Thief of Time, when Leaphorn's wife has died a few months earlier, he reflects on his marriage. Leaphorn had been funded to continue in anthropology, get his doctorate, be a professor. Then he met Emma on the campus, and married her. He found a job to support them and keep them on the reservation where she wanted to live. He had the habit of trying out theories of people with her, a sharp observer, as he solved his cases, and he misses that immediately as he grieves the loss of her. In The Fallen Man it is revealed that Emma survived the surgery to remove the benign brain tumor; she died from a staph infection following the surgery, when Jim Chee is in the same hospital recovering from wounds sustained on duty. Emma and her relationship with her husband are revealed after she dies, in Joe's recollections of how he would talk with her, the decisions he made to please her, and how he feels guilty having another woman in the house, in Emma's room, as he muses in Hunting Badger.

Later, Leaphorn becomes attracted to an anthropologist named Louisa Bourebonette, whom he meets while working on a case in Coyote Waits. Louisa sometimes helps in collecting information to solve cases, as she interviews older Indians of several tribes, in her professional pursuits of documenting the origin stories of each tribe. Leaphorn is always in love with Emma, but he enjoys Louisa's sharp mind and her company.

Professional life

He is perhaps 40 and a lieutenant in the first novel (The Blessing Way), so the early days of his career as a policeman are revealed as stories of the past in the novels. Educated in assimilationist Indian boarding schools operated by the Bureau of Indian Affairs, he is not as well versed in Navajo rituals as the younger officer Chee, though he has attended the usual ceremonies, and does so in the novels (e.g., attending the multi-day Kinaalda ceremony on two separate days while solving the case in Listening Woman). He is a police officer for the Navajo and he is a Navajo, fluent in that language and in English. In the first three novels of the series, he has no staff; he reports to superiors in the Navajo Tribal Police (Captain Largo) and works with officers of other tribes and often with agents of the FBI and other federal investigative agencies. Leaphorn's approach to his cases is informed by some Navajo, or Dine, tradition, but is also influenced by Anglo-European logic. In Skinwalkers, Leaphorn has responsibilities to assign officers where they are needed for specific situations.

The attraction of police detective work for him is the freedom to follow his curiosity to solve problems. He is skilled in tracking in the desert country where it can be months between rainfalls, and tracks are unchanged unless another crosses the path. He seeks the logic of each situation.

Leaphorn typically doesn't act as a leader in the ceremonies of his own culture and is resistant to some Navajo taboos. At the same time, he realizes that many traditional Navajo follow those beliefs and often act on them, in cases that result in violence. He holds a Navajo world view, with no expectation of heaven in the afterlife, instead a need to find his place in this life and lead his life well. He follows the rules of courtesy of the Navajo as to the ebb and flow of conversations, and his ability to handle demanding characters from the white world around him. He is still learning the ways of the white men, as he cannot understand the choices made by graduate student Ted Isaacs, who leaves the love of his life on her own when she needs a place to live, in favor of his career, in Dance Hall of the Dead. In Talking God, the year following the death of his wife, Leaphorn has a Blessing Way ceremony done for him by Jim Chee, an event that both find beneficial.

The belief in skinwalkers, common among so many Navajos, is the one that bothers him most and for good reason. The skinwalker, who is a human being, has many attributes that are not human, such as the ability to turn into a bird or animal, to fly, and to put a bit of bone into a person, thus marking the person for death. In times of troubles, when people seek a scapegoat, the notion of a skinwalker being the cause gives a person reason to kill the skinwalker. He encountered a triple murder by one man who then killed himself early in his police career, we learn in The Blessing Way (the first book in the series), the one man believing the others to be skinwalkers; and Leaphorn did not act on that knowledge as quickly as he later thought he might have. As a police officer, he arrests murderers, along with the FBI, who are formally responsible for prosecuting homicides on the reservation. Times of troubles may mean fatal medical problems for the one seeking a scapegoat when there is no cure. This to Leaphorn is superstition that would be helped greatly by seeking treatment and by accepting current knowledge of health and disease, then accepting fate in the Navajo way.

Leaphorn is called the "Legendary Lieutenant" by other police officers in later novels, and especially by Chee, who holds him in awe.

Leaphorn lives in the Navajo capital of Window Rock, Arizona. In his career he worked in a number of locations, including a brief stint training at the FBI headquarters in Washington, D.C. His longest assignment appears to have been in Tuba City, Arizona, where he was a traffic cop, before the story told in The Blessing Way, as described in the Listening Woman.

Leaphorn is connected to many on the reservation. One example is his encounter with John "Shorty" McGinnis in Listening Woman (Chapter 5), where McGinnis tells Leaphorn he knew his maternal grandfather in younger days. His grandfather had not yet earned the title of Hosteen, and was called Horse Kicker by his friends, all long before Leaphorn's time. McGinnis is again a useful contact in Skinwalkers and in Coyote Waits.

Leaphorn creates a large, color-coded map for his police work. It is an old auto club road map of the Four Corners area, Indian country. On this map he marks different kinds of crimes with different-colored pins - red-headed pins stand for alcohol-related crimes, including bootlegging as alcohol is illegal on the reservation, blue for sheep stealing, brown with a white center for the rare homicides and others for "white man crimes" like burglary, vandalism and robbery, which occurred mainly on the edges of the reservation. This process allows him to notice patterns that link various crimes together, and helps him solve them. This map is enhanced by notations, as well, noting places where roads have washed out in a heavy rain, places where witchcraft has been reported, and summer camps for sheep grazing for various Navajo families. In Coyote Waits, Leaphorn's map is described as a photographic enlargement of an auto club map, posted up in his office; he used it trying to make sense of the murder by Ashie Pinto, but in that case most of the useful information comes from conversations with people who seek him out (the niece of Ashie Pinto), or who he seeks out (McGinnis, Kennedy), and his running internal conversations as if his wife were still alive to make useful observations on people, than from studying the map. The map shows only how very far from home Ashie Pinto was arrested, with no explanation how he arrived at the scene of the murders.

Five months before The Fallen Man, Leaphorn retires, and as part of the plot he gets a commission as a private investigator. An old case he left as an unsolved missing person case is solved on the basis of new information uncovered by Jim Chee. Chee accepts praise from Leaphorn and the two work together to resolve the case. He gives Jim Chee advice when requested, and shares information with him, as Chee develops more confidence in himself and evaluates Leaphorn as a very smart man. Leaphorn does not enjoy retirement. His contacts throughout the Southwest, and his renown, lead him into a number of cases, after his active police career is over. in Hunting Badger, Leaphorn and Chee work together, including using the map to figure out where the criminals are hiding, matching up their trail with the story of an old coal mine shaft that opened on the rim of Gothic Creek Canyon. Leaphorn was drawn into that case as a pawn of the main criminal, which he realizes at the end, but he also follows through with Chee until the very end.

Reception
Joe Leaphorn is seen as a detective "who walks and talks softly" and comes alive as "Hillerman's anything but wooden Indians and the way in which he informs their way of life with affection and dignity." The "quiet, wise presence of Leaphorn himself, unselfconsciously drawing on the best of two clashing cultures." is a strong appeal of the series of novels by Hillerman. When he and Jim Chee work together the first time, the contrast focuses on him as "middle-aged, cynical Lieut. Joe Leaphorn and young, mystical Officer Jim Chee". The strength of the character of this fictional police detective is intimately tied to the strength of the novels, as one reviewer noted: "what makes Skinwalkers so outstanding, for me, is that it takes the reader inside the world of the Navajo reservation".

In later novels, Leaphorn is described as "ruminatively intelligent". When Chee formally reports to Leaphorn, the two characters are contrasted: "The byplay between prickly Leaphorn and spiritual Chee; Chee's sobering reflections on Navajo and white people's justice; problem-strewn new romantic intrigues for both heroes--all of these make this not only a masterful novel in its own right, but an object lesson in how to develop an outstanding series." 

After Leaphorn retires, he continues to get involved in cases with Lt. Chee: "It'll take the combined ingenuity of irascible Leaphorn and contemplative Chee to spot the clue Leaphorn missed a decade ago--and their combined wisdom to figure out what to do with their knowledge." Leaphorn continues to straddle the Navajo ways and the modern world to solve crimes: "Joe Leaphorn, now retired as a tribal policeman, says, Witches offer an easy explanation for unexplained illnesses. So it's just as logical to suspect, as do some biologists working for the Indian Health Service, that a new and extraordinarily virulent strain of bubonic plague is abroad." Even in retirement, his curiosity endures: "Leaphorn's trademark curiosity sends him in search of possible links between this homicide and another two years earlier."

Bibliography
Joe Leaphorn appears in the following novels:

The Blessing Way (1970) 
Dance Hall of the Dead (1973) 
Listening Woman (1978) 

In the three novels published between 1978 and 1986, the stories focus on the younger Jim Chee.

In each of the following Leaphorn and Jim Chee work together:
Skinwalkers  (1986) 
A Thief of Time (1988) 
Talking God (1989) 
Coyote Waits (1990) 
Sacred Clowns (1993) 
The Fallen Man (1996) 
The First Eagle (1998) 
Hunting Badger (1999) 
The Wailing Wind (2002) 
The Sinister Pig (2003) 
Skeleton Man  (2004) 
The Shape Shifter (2006) 
Spider Woman's Daughter (October 2013) (written by Anne Hillerman) HarperCollins 
Rock With Wings (May 2015) (written by Anne Hillerman) HarperCollins 
Song of the Lion (April 2017) (written by Anne Hillerman)

Skinwalkers, A Thief of Time and Coyote Waits were each adapted for television as part of the American Mystery! series by the Public Broadcasting Service (PBS)

References

Fictional American police detectives
Fictional characters from Arizona
Fictional Navajo people
Fictional police lieutenants